Hans Kohala (born 3 June 1966 in Nacka) is a Swedish luger who competed in the early 1990s. Competing in two Winter Olympics, he earned his best finish of sixth in the men's doubles at Albertville in 1992.

Kohala is president of the Swedish Luge Association.

His children Svante and Tove are members of the Swedish luge national team.

References

External links
 
1992 luge men's doubles results
1994 luge men's doubles results

1966 births
Living people
People from Nacka Municipality
Lugers at the 1992 Winter Olympics
Lugers at the 1994 Winter Olympics
Swedish male lugers
Olympic lugers of Sweden
Sportspeople from Stockholm County